Ternekal is a village in Kurnool district of the Indian state of Andhra Pradesh. It is located in Devanakonda mandal.

Villages in Kurnool district